Kenneth Michael Hoyt (born March 2, 1948) is a senior United States district judge of the United States District Court for the Southern District of Texas.

Education and career

Born in San Augustine County, Texas, Hoyt received an Artium Baccalaureus degree from Texas Southern University in 1969 and a Juris Doctor from the Thurgood Marshall School of Law at Texas Southern University in 1972. He was in private practice in Houston, Texas from 1972 to 1985. He was a city attorney of Kendleton, Texas from 1975 to 1981, and then of Prairie View, Texas. Hoyt served as a presiding judge of the 125th Civil District Court of Texas from 1981 to 1982. At the same time, Hoyt was a member of the faculty of the South Texas College Trial Advocacy Program, and from 1983 to 1984, he was an adjunct professor at the Thurgood Marshall School of Law. He was a justice of the First District Court of Appeals of Texas from 1985 to 1988.

Federal judicial service

On November 24, 1987, Hoyt was nominated by President Ronald Reagan to a seat on the United States District Court for the Southern District of Texas vacated by Judge Carl Olaf Bue Jr. Hoyt was confirmed by the United States Senate on March 31, 1988, and received his commission on April 1, 1988. Hoyt was the second African American federal judge in the state of Texas. He took senior status on March 2, 2013.

See also 
 List of African-American federal judges
 List of African-American jurists

References

Sources
 

1948 births
Living people
Texas Southern University alumni
South Texas College people
Texas Southern University faculty
Texas state court judges
African-American judges
Judges of the United States District Court for the Southern District of Texas
United States district court judges appointed by Ronald Reagan
20th-century American judges
Thurgood Marshall School of Law alumni
People from San Augustine County, Texas
People from Fort Bend County, Texas
People from Prairie View, Texas
21st-century American judges